Mì or mi is a Vietnamese term for yellow wheat noodles. It can also refer to egg noodles. They were brought over to Vietnam as wonton noodles by Chinese immigrants. The Vietnamese version of wonton noodles is mì hoành thánh. The noodles can be either thin or wide and are commonly used in súp mì (noodle soup) and mì khô (dry noodles).

Types
Mì or noodle soup can be served with a pork-based broth with the noodles and other ingredients together or with the soup served separately. Common ingredients are noodles, pork broth, ground pork, chives and a choice of meats or toppings. They can be served with spicy pickled green papaya (đu đủ chua ngọt) on the side. Condiments may include soy sauce, sa tế, pickled jalapenos, and red or white vinegar.

Mi hoanh thanh - wonton noodle soup
Mi sui (xui) cao - dumpling noodle soup
Mi thap cam - combination noodle soup with barbecue pork (xa xiu/char siu), chicken, shrimp, squid
Mi vit quay - Cantonese-style roast duck noodle soup Mi vit tiem - seared and braised duck leg noodle soup with herbs, soy sauce, and bok choyMi do bien - seafood noodle soup
Mi sate bo - beef sate noodle soup
Mi bo vien - beef meatball noodle soup
Mi ca vien - fishball noodle soup

See also

 List of soups
 List of Vietnamese culinary specialities
 List of Vietnamese dishes
 Ramen
 Vietnamese cuisine
 Vietnamese noodles

References

National dishes
Street food in Vietnam
Vietnamese soups
Vietnamese words and phrases
Vietnamese-American cuisine
Noodle soups
Vietnamese noodle dishes